eClicto is the first Polish e-book Reader, specially designed for reading e-Books, listening to MP3 music or audio-books.
It is produced by the Polish company Kolporter Info SA. eClicto was first released on December 10, 2009 (with 100 free e-books) retailing for 899 PLN (about $300 USD).
It supports ePub, pdf and txt files.

There are a few models of e-book readers distributed in Poland, including iLiad and Cybook. A problem affecting the e-book market in Poland is that there is a lack of Polish-language books available in e-reader friendly formats like ePub. The eClicto project is seeking to change that.

eClicto is also a name of the store with e-books in Polish.

See also
 Comparison of e-book readers
 Comparison of tablet computers

References

External links
  The official site of the project

Dedicated ebook devices